Rexford Sefah Ahima is a Professor of Medicine, Public Health and Nursing; Bloomberg Distinguished Professor of Diabetes at the Johns Hopkins Medical School; and the Director of the Division of Endocrinology, Diabetes and Metabolism, Johns Hopkins University School of Medicine. Ahima's research focuses on central and peripheral actions of adipocyte hormones in energy homeostasis, and glucose and lipid metabolism.

Biography
Rexford Ahima had his high school education at Accra Academy in Ghana. He gained a Bachelor of Science degree in Endocrinology from the Middlesex Hospital Medical School, University of London. He received his M.D. from the University of Ghana Medical School in 1986 and a Ph.D from Tulane University in New Orleans, Louisiana in 1992. Ahima had his residency training in Internal Medicine at the Albert Einstein College of Medicine, Jack D. Weiler Hospital and Jacobi Medical Center in New York. Ahima did his clinical and research fellowship training in Endocrinology, Diabetes and Metabolism at the Beth Israel Deaconess Medical Center and Harvard Medical School in Boston.
 
At Harvard, he had his research fellowship in the laboratory of Dr. Jeffrey S. Flier, after which he served as an instructor in Medicine at Harvard before moving to the University of Pennsylvania in 1999. He became a tenured Professor of Medicine at the Perelman School of Medicine at the University of Pennsylvania and was the Director of Obesity Unit, Institute for Diabetes, Obesity and Metabolism and Director of Diabetes Research Center Mouse Phenotyping Core.
 
In 2016, Ahima joined Johns Hopkins University as a Bloomberg Distinguished Professor of Diabetes with appointments in the School of Medicine, School of Nursing, and Bloomberg School of Public Health. He was also appointed Leader of the Johns Hopkins University Diabetes Initiative and Director of the Division of Endocrinology, Diabetes and Metabolism.

Research
Dr. Ahima’s laboratory investigates CNS and peripheral actions of adipokines in energy homeostasis, and glucose and lipid metabolism. He has performed seminal studies to define the roles of leptin, adiponectin and resistin in obesity and diabetes using genetic techniques and metabolic phenotyping of mouse models. Moreover, he is involved in clinical and population studies focusing on the pathogenesis of obesity and Diabetes.

Awards and distinctions
Ahima was elected to the National Academy of Medicine in 2020, the American Society for Clinical Investigation in 2005, the Association of American Physicians in 2010), the Interurban Clinical Club, and a is a fellow of the American Association for the Advancement of Science, the American College of Physicians, and the Obesity Society. He is a past associate editor of the journals Gastroenterology, Molecular Endocrinology, Endocrinology, and Endocrine Reviews. He was the editor-in-chief of the Journal of Clinical Investigation. He is currently the editor of the Annals of the New York Academy of Sciences Year in Diabetes and Obesity.

Publications 
Ahima has more than 50,000 citations in Google Scholar and h-index of 88.

 Pubmed Citations
 Google Scholar Citations

Books

 Can the Obesity Crisis Be Reversed? (2021)
Metabolic syndrome: a comprehensive textbook (Springer)
Metabolic basis of obesity (Springer)
Obesity epidemiology, pathogenesis, and treatment: a multidisciplinary approach (Apple/CRC)
Childhood obesity: prevalence, pathophysiology, and management (Apple/CRC)
The Year in Diabetes and Obesity (Annals of the New York Academy of Sciences)_review series

 Highly Cited Articles (more than 1300 citations)

 2001 with CM Steppan, ST Bailey, S Bhat, EJ Brown, RR Banerjee, CM Wrigth, HR Patel, MA Lazar, The hormone resistin links obesity to diabetes, in: Nature. Vol. 409, nº 6818; 307-312.
 1996 with D Prabakaran, C Mantzoros, D Qu, B Lowell, E Maratos-Flier, JS Flier, Role of leptin in the neuroendocrine response to fasting, in Nature. Vol. 382, nº 6588; 250-252.
 2000 with JS Flier, Leptin, in Annual Review of Physiology. Vol. 62, nº 1; 413-437.
 2000 with JS Flier, Adipose tissue as an endocrine organ, in Trends in Endocrinology & Metabolism. Vol. 11, nº 8; 327-332.
 2009 with MA Hildebrandt, C Hoffman, SA Sherrill-Mix, SA Keilbaugh, M Hamady, YY Chen, R Knight, F Bushman, GD Wu, High-fat diet determines the composition of the murine gut microbiome independently of obesity, in Gastroenterology. Vol. 137, nº 5; 1716-1724.

See also
Journal of Clinical Investigation
Bloomberg Distinguished Professorships

References

External links
 Google Scholar Citations

Alumni of the Accra Academy
Living people
Year of birth missing (living people)
21st-century African-American scientists
21st-century African-American physicians
21st-century American physicians
University of Ghana Medical School alumni
Journal of Clinical Investigation editors
Physician-scientists
Members of the National Academy of Medicine